Sonia Singh is an Indian television actress. She is known for her role as Dr. Keerti Mehra in Star One's  Dill Mill Gayye, Richa Thakral in Parichay, Sushma (Sush) in Bhabhi and Antara in Kumkum – Ek Pyara Sa Bandhan

Television

Web series

References

External links

Living people
Indian television actresses
Indian soap opera actresses
Year of birth missing (living people)